Pierce is an unincorporated community and coal town in Tucker County, West Virginia, United States.

The community was named after one Mr. Pierce, a railroad official.

References 

Unincorporated communities in West Virginia
Unincorporated communities in Tucker County, West Virginia
Coal towns in West Virginia